Pic dels Aspres is a mountain in the northwest of the principality of Andorra, close to the border with Spain. The nearest town is Arinsal, La Massana.

Geographic features
Some 250 metres below the summit is a round cirque, approximately 100 metres in diameter, which was formed by glacial erosion during the Last Glacial Maximum and which is now a lake, Estany de les Truites (the trout lake).

The valley to the south of the mountain is used as a ski area.

History
During the neolithic, sedentary populations inhabited the dels Aspres hills, and built megalithic dolmens in the area.

References

Mountains of Andorra
Mountains of the Pyrenees
Two-thousanders of Andorra